Ochicanthon is a genus of Scarabaeidae or scarab beetles in the superfamily Scarabaeoidea.

Species
 Ochicanthon besucheti Cuccodoro, 2011
 Ochicanthon cambeforti (Ochi, Kon & Kikuta, 1997)
 Ochicanthon ceylonicus Cuccodoro, 2011
 Ochicanthon cingalensis (Arrow, 1931)
 Ochicanthon crockermontis Krikken & Huijbregts, 2007
 Ochicanthon crypticus Krikken & Huijbregts, 2007
 Ochicanthon danum Krikken & Huijbregts, 2007
 Ochicanthon deplanatus (Paulian, 1983)
 Ochicanthon devagiriensis Sabu & Latha, 2011
 Ochicanthon dulitmontis Krikken & Huijbregts, 2007
 Ochicanthon dytiscoides (Boucomont, 1914)
 Ochicanthon edmondsi Krikken & Huijbregts, 2007
 Ochicanthon ernei Cuccodoro, 2011
 Ochicanthon fernandoi Sabu & Latha, 2011
 Ochicanthon gangkui (Ochi, Kon & Kikuta, 1997)
 Ochicanthon gauricola Cuccodoro, 2011
 Ochicanthon hanskii Krikken & Huijbregts, 2007
 Ochicanthon hikidai (Ochi, Kon & Kikuta, 1997)
 Ochicanthon javanus Krikken & Huijbregts, 2007
 Ochicanthon karasuyamai Ochi, Kon & Kawahara, 2007
 Ochicanthon kikutai Ochi, Ueda & Kon, 2006
 Ochicanthon kimanis Krikken & Huijbregts, 2007
 Ochicanthon laetus (Arrow, 1931)
 Ochicanthon loebli (Paulian, 1980)
 Ochicanthon maryatiae Ochi, Ueda & Kon, 2006
 Ochicanthon masumotoi (Ochi & Araya, 1996)
 Ochicanthon mulu Krikken & Huijbregts, 2007
 Ochicanthon murthyi Vinod & Sabu, 2011
 Ochicanthon mussardi Cuccodoro, 2011
 Ochicanthon neglectus Krikken & Huijbregts, 2007
 Ochicanthon niinoii Ochi & Kon, 2014
 Ochicanthon niisatoi Ochi, Kon & Masumoto, 2017
 Ochicanthon nitidus (Paulian, 1980)
 Ochicanthon obscurus (Boucomont, 1920)
 Ochicanthon ochii (Hanboonsong & Masumoto, 2001)
 Ochicanthon oharai Ochi, Kon & Hartini, 2008
 Ochicanthon okudai Ochi & Kon, 2014
 Ochicanthon parantisae (Ochi, Kon & Kikuta, 1997)
 Ochicanthon peninsularis Krikken & Huijbregts, 2007
 Ochicanthon philippinensev (Ochi, 1990)
 Ochicanthon punctatus (Boucomont, 1914)
 Ochicanthon ranongensis Ochi, Kon & Masumoto, 2020
 Ochicanthon rombauti Krikken & Huijbregts, 2007
 Ochicanthon takakui Ochi, Kon & Hartini, 2008
 Ochicanthon takuapaensis Ochi, Kon & Masumoto, 2020
 Ochicanthon tambunan Krikken & Huijbregts, 2007
 Ochicanthon thai (Paulian, 1987)
 Ochicanthon thailandicum (Masumoto, 1989)
 Ochicanthon tristis (Arrow, 1931)
 Ochicanthon tristoides (Paulian, 1983)
 Ochicanthon uedai Ochi, Kon & Hartini, 2008
 Ochicanthon vazdemelloi Ochi, Kon & Hartini, 2009
 Ochicanthon woroae Ochi, Ueda & Kon, 2006

References

Scarabaeidae